Mark Alan Ruffalo (born November 22, 1967) is an American actor and producer. He began acting in the early 1990s and first gained recognition for his work in Kenneth Lonergan's play This Is Our Youth (1998) and drama film You Can Count on Me (2000). He went on to star in the romantic comedies 13 Going on 30 (2004), Just like Heaven (2005) and the thrillers In the Cut (2003), Zodiac (2007), and Shutter Island (2010). He received a Tony Award nomination for his supporting role in the Broadway revival of Awake and Sing! in 2006. Ruffalo gained international recognition for playing Bruce Banner / Hulk since 2012 in the superhero franchise of the Marvel Cinematic Universe, most recently appearing in the television series She-Hulk: Attorney at Law (2022).

Ruffalo gained nominations for the Academy Award for Best Supporting Actor for playing a sperm-donor in the comedy-drama The Kids Are All Right (2010), Dave Schultz in the biopic Foxcatcher (2014), and Michael Rezendes in the drama Spotlight (2015). He won the Screen Actors Guild Award for Best Actor in a TV Movie for playing a gay writer and activist in the television drama film The Normal Heart (2015), and the Primetime Emmy Award for Outstanding Lead Actor in a Limited Series or Movie for his dual role as identical twins in the miniseries I Know This Much Is True (2020). Ruffalo is one of the few performers to receive all four EGOT nominations.

Early life
Mark Alan Ruffalo was born on November 22, 1967, in Kenosha, Wisconsin. His mother, Marie Rose, is a hairdresser and stylist and his father, Frank Lawrence Ruffalo Jr., worked as a construction painter. He has two sisters, Tania and Nicole, and a brother, Scott (died 2008). His father is of Italian descent, from Girifalco and his mother is of French Canadian and Italian ancestry.

Ruffalo attended both Catholic and progressive schools throughout his education. Ruffalo has described himself as having been a "happy kid", although he struggled with undiagnosed dyslexia and ADHD as a child and a young adult.

Ruffalo spent his teen years in Virginia Beach, Virginia, where his father worked. He competed in wrestling in junior high and high school in Wisconsin and Virginia. Ruffalo graduated from First Colonial High School in Virginia Beach, where he acted for the Patriot Playhouse. He moved with his family to San Diego, California and later to Los Angeles, where he took classes at the Stella Adler Conservatory and co-founded the Orpheus Theatre Company. With the theater company, he wrote, directed, and starred in a number of plays. He also spent close to a decade working as a bartender.

Career

Acting
He made his screen debut in an episode of CBS Summer Playhouse (1989), followed by minor film roles, and was part of the original cast of This Is Our Youth (1996).

Ruffalo played 'Vinnie Webber', a minor character in Series 1 Episode 9 of Due South, first broadcast in Canada in 1994.

Ruffalo had minor roles in films including The Dentist (1996), the low-key crime comedy Safe Men (1998), and Ang Lee's Civil War western Ride with the Devil (1999). Through a chance meeting with writer Kenneth Lonergan, Ruffalo began collaborating with him and appeared in several of his plays, including the original cast of This is Our Youth (1996), which led to Ruffalo's role as Laura Linney's character's brother in Lonergan's Academy Award-nominated 2000 film You Can Count on Me. He received favorable reviews for his performance in this film, often earning comparisons to the young Marlon Brando, and won awards from the Los Angeles Film Critics Association and Montreal World Film Festival.
His next role was in 2001 in Rod Lurie's The Last Castle playing a bookie in a military prison alongside Robert Redford. It led to other significant roles, including the films XX/XY (2002), Isabel Coixet's My Life Without Me, John Woo's Windtalkers (2003), Jane Campion's In the Cut (2003), Michel Gondry's Eternal Sunshine of the Spotless Mind (2004), and We Don't Live Here Anymore (2004), which is based on two short stories written by Andre Dubus. He appeared opposite Jamie Foxx and Tom Cruise as a narcotics detective in Michael Mann's crime thriller Collateral (2004).

In the mid-2000s, Ruffalo appeared as a romantic lead in View From the Top (2002), 13 Going on 30 (2004), Just Like Heaven (2005) and Rumor Has It (2005). In 2006, Ruffalo starred in Clifford Odets's Awake and Sing! at the Belasco Theatre in New York, for which he was nominated for a Tony Award for Best Featured Actor in a Play. In March 2007, he appeared in Zodiac as SFPD homicide inspector Dave Toschi, who ran the investigation to find and apprehend the Zodiac killer from 1969 through most of the 1970s. In 2007, Ruffalo played divorced lawyer Dwight Arno, who accidentally kills a child and speeds away, in Terry George's film Reservation Road, based on the novel by John Burnham Schwartz.

In 2008, Ruffalo starred as a con man in The Brothers Bloom with Adrien Brody and Rachel Weisz and co-starred with Julianne Moore in Blindness. 2008 also saw Ruffalo in Brian Goodman's What Doesn't Kill You with Ethan Hawke and Amanda Peet, which was shown at the Toronto International Film Festival. In 2009, he played a brief role in the film Where the Wild Things Are as Max's mother's boyfriend. In 2010, he co-starred in the Martin Scorsese thriller Shutter Island as U.S. Marshal Chuck Aule, the partner of Leonardo DiCaprio's character Teddy Daniels.

In 2010, he starred in Lisa Cholodenko's The Kids Are All Right, with Annette Bening and Julianne Moore. Ruffalo stated in an interview that he approached Cholodenko after watching High Art and said he would love to work with her. Years later, she called Ruffalo and said she wrote a script and had him in mind for the part. His performance earned him an Academy Award nomination for Best Supporting Actor.

In March 2010, Ruffalo signed with the Creative Artists Agency (CAA); in June 2010, he signed on with the United Talent Agency (UTA).

Ruffalo starred in The Avengers (2012), the sixth installment of the Marvel Cinematic Universe, replacing Edward Norton as Dr. Bruce Banner / Hulk. He reprised the role again in Avengers: Age of Ultron (2015), Thor: Ragnarok (2017), Avengers: Infinity War (2018), and Avengers: Endgame (2019). He has been noted for spoiling the endings of Avengers: Infinity War a year ahead of theatrical release, as well as Avengers: Endgame a few weeks ahead of release. Ruffalo also made cameo appearances as Banner in Iron Man 3, Captain Marvel, and Shang-Chi and the Legend of the Ten Rings, and he reprised the role in She-Hulk: Attorney at Law.

In 2014, Ruffalo starred as Ned Weeks in a television adaptation of Larry Kramer's AIDS-era play, The Normal Heart; his performance earned him an Emmy nomination. He says he has had an outpouring of support for his performance: I've never had so sincere and vulnerable a response from people for anything that I've ever done. ... And of everything that I've done since I've been on social media, which hasn't been that long, by the way, I haven't had such an overwhelmingly positive response as I have from The Normal Heart directly to me. And it's a blessing, man. If this is it, if I have a piano dropped on me tomorrow, then I would go down thinking, "You know what, I did okay as far as my career goes, because that's a gift. That's rare."

Also in 2014, Ruffalo received his second Academy Award nomination for his portrayal of wrestler Dave Schultz in the biographical drama Foxcatcher. The next year in 2015, he starred as a father of two with bipolar disorder in the independent comedy film Infinitely Polar Bear, for which he earned a Golden Globe Award nomination, and he also appeared as journalist Michael Rezendes in the drama film Spotlight, for which he earned his third Academy Award nomination and a BAFTA Award nomination.

Directing
He directed a number of plays during his time at the Orpheus Theatre Company, and made his feature film directorial debut with 2010 indie film Sympathy for Delicious, which premiered at the Sundance Film Festival and won the Special Jury Prize.

Activism

In 2008, Ruffalo expressed concern that gas companies were eyeing his family's land in Callicoon, New York. After doing his own investigation, New York magazine wrote, he became "anti-fracking's first famous face." On October 4, 2010, Ruffalo appeared on The Rachel Maddow Show to discuss hydraulic fracturing and the FRAC Act of 2009. He claimed in the December 2010 issue of GQ that after he organized screenings in Pennsylvania of a documentary about natural-gas-drilling called Gasland, he was placed on a terror advisory list. The Pennsylvania Governor's Office of Homeland Security denied the claim.

In 2015, Ruffalo supported "Education Is Not a Crime" campaign among a lot of artists and intellectuals including Nazanin Boniadi, Abbas Milani, Mohsen Makhmalbaf, Azar Nafisi, Omid Djalili, Eva LaRue, Mohammad Maleki (former president of the University of Tehran), and Nobel Peace laureates such as Archbishop Desmond Tutu, Shirin Ebadi, Tawakkol Karman, Jody Williams, and Mairead Maguire, to draw attention to the Iranian government's systematic denial of university education to young Baha'is.

In February 2016, Ruffalo tweeted a Tech Times article in which a group of Argentinian doctors attributed the cause of a microcephaly outbreak in Brazil to the use of a larvicide chemical added to reservoirs of drinking water to combat dengue fever, rather than the Zika virus. The New York Times described the claim as "dubious" and stated that those "sounding the alarm", did not mention that the larvicide did not work through the central nervous system and that it has been approved by the World Health Organization.

In March 2016, Ruffalo narrated and produced Dear President Obama: The Clean Energy Revolution Is Now, a documentary by director Jon Bowermaster which looks at President Barack Obama's environmental tenure and legacy concerning the massive expansion of oil and natural gas drilling.

In June 2017, Ruffalo posted a petition on Twitter urging NBC to stop hiring white conservative commentators. The same month, Ruffalo endorsed Labour Party leader Jeremy Corbyn in the 2017 UK general election. He tweeted: "Because @jeremycorbyn offers people an alternative to the Corporate status quo, which never ends well for them, I humbly endorse Corbyn." In October, Ruffalo actively supported the Standing Rock Indian Reservation in their opposition to the Dakota Access Pipeline project.

Also in 2019, Ruffalo starred in and co-produced Dark Waters, which spotlighted another one of his environmental concerns with its true-life depiction of a corporate lawyer's relentless pursuit of justice to expose poisonous pollution by chemical behemoth DuPont. In June 2020, Ruffalo appeared in a webinar conference for the Irish Green Party to encourage members to accept the recently negotiated programme for government, agreed between the party, Fine Gael and Fianna Fáil.

In October 2020, speaking to Mehdi Hasan, Ruffalo condemned what he called Israel's "asymmetrical warfare" against the Palestinians, stating, "There is no reason that an ally of America should not be held to the same standards as any other nation in the world." Ruffalo also related that he had been called an antisemite for his views, saying, "[It's] really tough to hear. And the fact that so many people will take it to that extreme, when you're talking about that kind of inequality, that kind of oppression, that kind of apartheid." In 2021, he said it was "inflammatory" and "disrespectful" to suggest Israel is committing genocide.

In November 2021, Ruffalo criticized the not guilty ruling in the case of Kyle Rittenhouse in his hometown of Kenosha, Wisconsin and said the people shot by Rittenhouse were murdered.

Personal life

Ruffalo married Sunrise Coigney in 2000. They have three children.

After completing work on the film The Last Castle, Ruffalo was diagnosed with a vestibular schwannoma, a type of brain tumor also known as an acoustic neuroma. The tumor was found to be benign; however, the surgery to remove the mass resulted in partial facial paralysis and affected his hearing. The paralysis subsided after a year, but Ruffalo remains deaf in his left ear.

On December 1, 2008, Ruffalo's younger brother, Scott, was found outside his home on North Palm Drive in Beverly Hills with an execution-style bullet wound to the head. Scott was taken to a hospital, but died the following week. The case remains unsolved.

Ruffalo and his family live in Sullivan County, New York, describing the Catskill Mountains as his "home". Ruffalo also owns two apartments in New York City, one for business and another for investment. Ruffalo's mother and stepfather live in Boothbay Harbor, Maine, where he and his family occasionally spend their summers.

In May 2022, Ruffalo was sued by residents of Ellenville, New York for not cleaning up a fire that broke out on the set of a car dealership that was used as a location for I Know This Much Is True. The lawsuit claims that the residents suffered physical and emotional injuries and added that the fire caused damage to their homes and exposed them to toxic fumes.

Politics 
Ruffalo was interviewed by "We Are Change" at an anti-war rally in 2007. Ruffalo expressed views in line with the 9/11 truth movement when he stated: "I'm baffled by the way all three buildings came down. My first reaction was that buildings don't fall down like that."

Ruffalo is pro-choice. He has explained his opinion by saying: "I don't want to turn back the hands of time to when women shuttled across state lines in the thick of night to resolve an unwanted pregnancy, in a cheap hotel room." Ruffalo has called for an economic revolution, saying that "capitalism today is failing us, killing us, and robbing from our children's future."

He has shown support for the LGBT community; however, he has received backlash from the transgender community for supporting the casting of a man, Matt Bomer, to play a trans woman in the film Anything, on which Ruffalo was an executive producer.

In October 2019, Ruffalo tweeted that "until George W. Bush is brought to justice for the crimes of the Iraq War, (including American-led torture, Iraqi deaths & displacement, and the deep scars—emotional & otherwise—inflicted on our military that served his folly), we can’t even begin to talk about kindness." 

In the 2016 election, Ruffalo supported Democratic candidate Bernie Sanders. While on The Late Show with Stephen Colbert, Ruffalo endorsed Senator Bernie Sanders for president in 2020 United States presidential election, stating "you know when he gets in the office, he is going to be fighting for us". 

Ruffalo signed a letter supporting Labour Party leader Jeremy Corbyn describing him as "a beacon of hope in the struggle against emergent far-right nationalism, xenophobia and racism in much of the democratic world" and endorsed him for in the 2019 UK general election.

In April 2022, Ruffalo urged voters to check voter ID requirements in their states through posts to his social media. Ruffalo cited VoteRiders as a source of assistance for voter ID requirements across the United States .

Works and recognition

Ruffalo has had a range of credits on screen and stage, including several performances of varying genresmostly as a supporting actor. Ruffalo has been nominated three times for the Academy Award for Best Supporting Actor for the comedy-drama The Kids Are All Right (2010), the biopic Foxcatcher (2014), and the drama Spotlight (2015). He has also received two Primetime Emmy Awards; Outstanding Television Movie for The Normal Heart (2014) and Outstanding Lead Actor in a Limited Series or Movie for his role in I Know This Much Is True (2020). In 2018, he received a nomination for the Grammy Award for Best Spoken Word Album for the political audiobook Our Revolution: A Future to Believe In (2016). For his work on stage, Ruffalo has been once nominated for the Tony Award for Best Featured Actor in a Play for his role in a 2006 production of the dramatic play Awake and Sing!.

With nominations for the Emmy, Grammy, Oscar, and Tony, Ruffalo is one of a selected few performers to be nominated for the four major entertainment awards in the US (EGOT). His EGOT recognitions are:

Emmy Awards  3 nominations, 2 wins
2014  Outstanding Television Movie  The Normal Heart (win)
2014  Outstanding Lead Actor in a Limited Series or Movie  The Normal Heart (nomination)
2020  Outstanding Lead Actor in a Limited Series or Movie  I Know This Much Is True (win)
Grammy Awards  1 nomination
2018  Best Spoken Word Album  Our Revolution: A Future to Believe In (nomination)
Academy Awards (Oscar)  3 nominations
2011  Best Supporting Actor  The Kids Are All Right (nomination)
2015  Best Supporting Actor  Foxcatcher (nomination)
2016  Best Supporting Actor  Spotlight (nomination)
Tony Awards  1 nomination
2006  Best Featured Actor in a Play  Awake and Sing! (nomination)

Audiobooks 
 2016: Our Revolution: A Future to Believe In (together with Bernie Sanders, the author), Macmillan Audio,

See also
List of actors with Academy Award nominations
List of actors with two or more Academy Award nominations in acting categories
List of EGOT winners

References

External links

 
 Mark Ruffalo – People in Film at Focus Features
 Mark Ruffalo interview clips on Inside the Actors Studio
 Mark Ruffalo producer profile for The 1 Second Film

1967 births
Living people
20th-century American male actors
21st-century American male actors
9/11 conspiracy theorists
Actors from Kenosha, Wisconsin
American anti-capitalists
American conspiracy theorists
American democracy activists
American environmentalists
American film directors
American film producers
American humanitarians
American male film actors
American male stage actors
American male television actors
American male voice actors
American people of Italian descent
People of Calabrian descent
American people of French-Canadian descent
Anti-fracking movement
Audiobook narrators
Film producers from New York (state)
Film producers from Wisconsin
Male actors from New York City
Male actors from Virginia
Male actors from Wisconsin
Male feminists
Male motion capture actors
New York (state) Democrats
Outstanding Performance by a Cast in a Motion Picture Screen Actors Guild Award winners
Outstanding Performance by a Male Actor in a Miniseries or Television Movie Screen Actors Guild Award winners
Outstanding Performance by a Lead Actor in a Miniseries or Movie Primetime Emmy Award winners
People from Virginia Beach, Virginia
Theatre World Award winners
Virginia Democrats
Wisconsin Democrats
Actors with dyslexia